Hearts and Bones is the sixth solo studio album by American singer-songwriter Paul Simon. It was released in 1983 by Warner Bros. Records.

Background
The album was originally intended to be called Think Too Much, but Mo Ostin, president of Warner Bros. Records at the time, persuaded Simon to change it to Hearts and Bones. The album was written and recorded following Simon & Garfunkel's The Concert in Central Park in 1981, and the world tour of 1982–1983. Several songs intended for Think Too Much were previewed on tour, and Art Garfunkel worked on some of the songs with Simon in the studio, with an intention that the finished product would be an all-new Simon & Garfunkel studio album. The album, particularly the title song, was a reflection on Paul's relationship with actress Carrie Fisher, and Paul felt that it was too personal to be a Simon & Garfunkel album, instead deciding that it should be a solo album. This greatly annoyed Garfunkel and ensured that there would never again be another Simon & Garfunkel album. Garfunkel left the project and Simon erased all his vocals and reworked the material into a solo album.

Reception

Hearts and Bones charted for 18 weeks on the Billboard 200, peaking at No. 35, although it is considered to be a relative commercial failure.

Don Shewey of Rolling Stone concluded that the album "is all about heart versus mind, thinking versus feeling, and how these dichotomies get in the way of making music or love." He went on to call the songs "subtle", but added that "the music has a certain playfulness that matches the album's cerebral self-consciousness." In 1986, Robert Christgau of The Village Voice referred to the album as being "a finely wrought dead end." 

In retrospective reviews, William Ruhlmann of AllMusic called Hearts and Bones Simon's "most personal collection of songs, one of his most ambitious, and one of his best." Ruhlmann praised the lyrical handling of the subject of romance and the music's blending of doo-wop and rock and roll roots with contemporary styles. David Bloom of PopMatters found the album to be "riskier, both musically and lyrically," than its predecessor, One-Trick Pony (1980), "and more engrossing for it." He observed that the album was "so tied to Simon's escalating preoccupation with physical and emotional remoteness that it's hard to imagine anyone being surprised when it failed to move a fan base waiting for the next 'Late in the Evening'."

Track listing
All songs written by Paul Simon, except for closing of "The Late Great Johnny Ace", composed by Philip Glass.

Side one
"Allergies" – 4:37
"Hearts and Bones" – 5:37
"When Numbers Get Serious" – 3:25
"Think Too Much (b)" – 2:44
"Song About the Moon" – 4:07

Side two
"Think Too Much (a)" – 3:05
"Train in the Distance" – 5:11
"René and Georgette Magritte with Their Dog after the War" – 3:44
"Cars Are Cars" – 3:15
"The Late Great Johnny Ace" – 4:45

2004 CD reissue bonus tracks
"Shelter of Your Arms" (Unreleased Work-in-Progress) – 3:11
"Train in the Distance" (Original Acoustic Demo) – 3:13
"René and Georgette Magritte with Their Dog after the War" (Original Acoustic Demo) – 3:46
"The Late Great Johnny Ace" (Original Acoustic Demo) – 3:22

Personnel 
Musicians

Paul Simon – lead vocals, background vocals, acoustic guitar (1, 2, 4, 5, 10), electric guitars (8), LinnDrum programming (9)
Dean Parks – electric guitars (1, 4, 5, 7, 10), hi-strung guitar (2)
Al Di Meola – guitar solo (1)
Anthony Jackson – contrabass guitar (1–5, 7, 8, 9)
Steve Gadd – drums (1, 2, 4, 5, 10)
Steve Ferrone – additional drums (1), drums (3, 6)
Greg Phillinganes – Fender Rhodes (1, 5, 10)
Rob Sabino – synthesizers (1, 9), acoustic piano (8)
Rob Mounsey – synthesizers (1), vocoder (5)
Airto Moreira – percussion (1–4, 7)
Richard Tee – Fender Rhodes (2, 7, 8), keyboards (3), acoustic piano (4), synthesizers (8)
Mike Mainieri – vibraphone (2, 7), marimba (2, 4), 
Eric Gale – electric guitars (3)
Tom Coppola – Synclavier (3–6)
Marcus Miller – bass guitar (4, 7)
Nile Rodgers – electric guitars (6, 9), LinnDrum programming (9)
Bernard Edwards – bass guitar (6)
Jeff Porcaro – drums (7)
Jesse Levy – cello (7)
Peter Gordon – French horn (7)
Mark Rivera – alto saxophone (7)
Wells Christie – Synclavier (8)
The Harptones – backing vocals (8)
Sid McGinnis – electric guitars (10)
Michael Boddicker – synthesizer (10)
Michael Riesman – synthesizers (10)
Carol Wincenc – flute (10)
George Marge – bass clarinet (10)
Marin Alsop – violin (10)
Frederick Zlotkin – cello (10)
Jill Jaffe – viola (10)
David Nichtern – Synclavier programming

The uncredited horn section on "Allergies" and "Cars Are Cars" are Mark Rivera (saxophones), Jon Faddis and Alan Rubin (trumpets).

Technical

Paul Simon – producer 
Russ Titelman – producer 
Roy Halee – producer, engineer, mixing 
Lenny Waronker – co-producer (1, 5, 10)
Lee Herschberg – additional engineer
Jason Corsaro – additional engineer
Mark Linett – additional engineer
Gene Paul – additional engineer
James Dougherty – additional engineer
Eric Korte – second engineer 
Andy Hoffman – second engineer 
Terry Rosiello – second engineer
David Greenberg – second engineer 
Stuart Gitlin – second engineer
Ken Deane – second engineer 
Dan Nash – second engineer 
Jim Santis – second engineer 
Greg Calbi – mastering
Tom Bates – digital engineer 
Wayne Yurgelin – digital audio facilities
Julie Hooker – production assistant 
Kimberly Boyle – production assistant 
Jeffrey Kent Ayeroff – art direction 
Paula Greif – art direction
Jeri McManus – design 
E.K.T.V. – cover photo 
Arthur Elgort – inner photo
David Matthews – horn arrangements (1, 9)
The Harptones – background vocal arrangements (8)
George Delerue – orchestration (8)
Philip Glass – orchestration (10)
Michael Riesman – orchestra conductor (10)

Chart positions

References

External links

 Hearts and Bones (Adobe Flash) at Spotify (streamed copy where registered)

Paul Simon albums
1983 albums
Albums arranged by David Matthews (keyboardist)
Albums recorded at Sigma Sound Studios
Albums produced by Lenny Waronker
Albums produced by Russ Titelman
Albums produced by Roy Halee
Albums produced by Paul Simon
Warner Records albums